LMAB Corporation (LMAB-Group Int. Corporation), also known as Colburn & Hogen in New Zealand and Australia, was a privately held multinational corporation operating mainly in research and automation business areas between 2003 and 2014. LMAB was taken over by Bombardier in 2014.

The LMAB-Group was working in artificial intelligence research and in microchip technologies that enabled utility and industry customers to improve performance while lowering environmental impact.

The LMAB-Group Corporation was headquartered in Montreal, Quebec, Canada and near Dunedin in New Zealand. The LMAB-Group was formed in 2003, when Colburn & Hogen of Australia and LMAB of Switzerland merged under the name LMAB-Group.

Companies established in 2003
Multinational companies
Technology companies of Switzerland
Technology companies of Canada